Sonia Bompastor (born 8 June 1980) is a French football manager and former player who currently manages Lyon of the French Division 1 Féminine. She is the first person to win the UEFA Women's Champions League as both a player and a manager.

Bompastor was a midfielder, preferably on the left side; she also played left back. Bompastor was a two-time winner of the National Union of Professional Footballers (UNFP) Female Player of the Year, and following a move to the Women's Professional Soccer (WPS) league in the United States, earned Player of the Month and All-Star honors.

Bompastor began her football career joining US Mer in 1988. In 1992, she joined US Thoury. In the same year, Bompastor earned selection to nationally recognized Clairefontaine academy joining alongside a select group a female players. After her stint at Clairefontaine, she joined Tours EC, now the women's section of professional club Tours FC. In 2000, she joined Division 1 Féminine club ESOF Vendée La Roche-sur-Yon and performed well enough to earn a move to Montpellier. At Montpellier, Bompastor earned domestic and individual honors, which resulted in a move to champions Olympique Lyonnais. In 2008, she joined the new United States-based women's soccer league, Women's Professional Soccer, after her American playing rights were chosen by Washington Freedom in the 2008 WPS International Draft. After helping the Freedom reached the playoffs, Bompastor returned to France where she played for Paris Saint-Germain on loan. In 2010, she announced that she would be returned to Lyon for the 2010–11 season and, subsequently, was a part of the team that won the 2010–11 UEFA Women's Champions League.

Bompastor is also a French international. Prior to playing for the senior team, she played at youth level representing the under-18 team at the 1998 UEFA Women's Under-18 Championship. Bompastor made her senior international debut in February 2000 in a friendly match against Scotland. From 2004 to 2006, she served as the national team's captain. Bompastor has played in numerous tournaments for her nation beginning with UEFA Women's Euro 2001.

In June 2013, Bompastor chose to end her career after the French Women's Cup final. She became the academy director of Olympique Lyonnais Féminin after retirement. In April 2021, she took over as manager of Lyon's first team.

Club career

Early career

Bompastor was born in Blois and began playing football at an early age. Of Portuguese origin, both of her parents are from Póvoa de Varzim and most of her family still lives in the area. Bompastor told Ma Chaîne Sport that she always goes to Póvoa when she has the opportunity to do so. She was drawn to football through her father, who was a referee. He took her to many of the games he refereed on the weekends and Bompastor quickly developed an attraction towards the game.

Bompastor began her football career in 1988 at US Mer, a local club in a neighboring commune, playing with the club's mixed team. In 1992, she joined US Thoury. That same year, Bompastor earned selection to an exclusive female team that was given clearance to train at the Clairefontaine academy by the French Football Federation. The academy had quickly become a high-level training facility for male football players and supporters of women's football wanted younger women to be afforded the same benefits from the facilities as young men. Following vocational training at Clairefontaine, Bompastor moved to amateur team Tours EC. She spent four years at the club before joining ESOF Vendée La Roche-sur-Yon of the Division 1 Féminine in 2000.

Professional career 

Bompastor's professional career began with ESOF Vendée La Roche-sur-Yon in 2000.  She scored seven goals over her two years with the club before moving to Montpellier HSC in 2002.

At Montpellier, Bompastor blossomed and scored 38 goals over four seasons while helping the club win league titles in 2004 and 2005, as well as the Challenge de France (women's version of the Coupe de France).

Olympique Lyonnais was the next destination for Bompastor, for whom she joined in the summer of 2006.  She became an important part of the squads that won back-to-back league titles in 2007 and 2008, and of the squad that won the Challenge de France in 2008.  This gave her six titles in a span of four years, equal to teammates Camille Abily and Élodie Thomis who were also a part of the same Montpellier squad Bompastor previously had played for.

On 24 September 2008, Bompastor was selected to join the new United States-based women's soccer league, Women's Professional Soccer, after her American playing rights were chosen by Washington Freedom in the 2008 WPS International Draft. Her Olympique Lyonnais teammate Louisa Necib was also chosen by the Freedom.  In the 2009 Women's Professional Soccer season, Bompastor appeared in 19 games (all starts, 1709 total minutes) and scored four goals with six assists.  Following the conclusion of the season, she was loaned to D1 Féminine side Paris Saint-Germain.

International career 
Bompastor made her international debut for the Bleues on 26 February 2000 in a match against Scotland.  She was a member of the squads that participated in the 2001, 2005, and 2009 editions of the UEFA Women's Championship.  She also represented France at the 2003 FIFA Women's World Cup and the 2011 FIFA Women's World Cup.

On 27 September 2008, Bompastor picked up her 100th cap in a crucial UEFA Women's Euro 2009 qualifying match against Iceland, which France won 2–1.

Career statistics

Club 

Statistics accurate as of 18 September 2016

International 

(Correct as of 18 September 2016)

International goals 

|-
| 1 || 21 February 2004 || Stade de la Mosson, Montpellier, France ||  ||  ||  || Friendly
|-
| 2 || 21 February 2004 || Stade de La Mosson, Montpellier, France ||  ||  ||  || Friendly
|-
| 3 || 14 March 2004 || Estádio da Nora, Ferreiras, Portugal ||  ||  ||  || 2004 Algarve Cup
|-
| 4 || 16 March 2004 || Estádio Municipal, Quarteira, Portugal ||  ||  ||  || 2004 Algarve Cup
|-
| 5 || 21 February 2004 || Stade Auguste Delaune, Reims, France ||  ||  ||  || 2005 UEFA Women's Championship qualification
|-
| 6 || 21 February 2004 || Stade Fernand Sastre, Sens, France ||  ||  ||  || Friendly
|-
| 7 || 22 April 2006 || Stadion Eszperantó Út, Dunaújváros, Hungary ||  ||  ||  || 2007 FIFA Women's World Cup qualification 
|-
| 8 || 22 November 2006 || Stade de la Libération, Boulogne-sur-Mer, France ||  ||  ||  || Friendly
|-
| 9 || 23 April 2008 || Yiannis Pathiakakis Stadium, Akratitos, Greece ||  ||  ||  || UEFA Women's Euro 2009 qualifying
|-
| 10 || 25 April 2009 || Colmar Stadium, Colmar, France ||  ||  ||  || Friendly
|-
| 11 || 24 August 2009 || Ratina Stadion, Tampere, Finland ||  ||  ||  || UEFA Women's Euro 2009
|-
| 12 || 25 February 2010 || Richman Park, Dublin, Ireland ||  ||  ||  || Friendly
|-
| 13 || 27 March 2010 || Stade de la Libération, Boulogne-sur-Mer, France ||  ||  ||  || 2011 FIFA Women's World Cup qualification
|-
| 14 || 31 March 2010 || Windsor Park, Belfast, Northern Ireland ||  ||  ||  || 2011 FIFA Women's World Cup qualification
|-
| 15 || 15 September 2010 || Stadio Pietro Barbetti, Gubbio, Italy ||  ||  ||  || 2011 FIFA Women's World Cup qualification
|-
| 16 || 13 July 2011 || Borussia-Park, Mönchengladbach, Germany ||  ||  ||  || 2011 FIFA Women's World Cup
|-
| 17 || 26 October 2011 || Stade de l'Aube, Troyes, France ||  ||  ||  || UEFA Women's Euro 2013 qualifying
|-
| 18 || 28 February 2012 || GSP Stadium, Nicosia, Cyprus ||  ||  ||  || 2012 Cyprus Cup
|}

Managerial Statistics

Honours

Player 
Montpellier
Division 1 Féminine: 2003–04, 2004–05
Coupe de France Féminine: 2005–06

Lyon
Division 1 Féminine: 2006–07, 2007–08, 2008–09, 2010–11, 2011–12, 2012–13
Coupe de France Féminine: 2007–08, 2011–12, 2012–13
UEFA Women's Champions League: 2010–11, 2011–12

France
Cyprus Cup: 2012

Individual
UNFP Female Player of the Year:  2003–04, 2007–08
WPS Player of the Month: May 2009
WPS All-Star: 2009, 2010
FIFA Women's World Cup All-Star Team: 2011

Manager 
Lyon
Division 1 Féminine: 2021–22
Trophée des Championnes: 2022
UEFA Women's Champions League: 2021–22

Other 
Orders
Chevalier of the Ordre national du Mérite: 2014

References

External links 

 
 
 
 FFF player profile 
 Paris Saint-Germain player profile
 

1980 births
Living people
French expatriate sportspeople in the United States
French women's footballers
French people of Portuguese descent
Washington Freedom players
Paris Saint-Germain Féminine players
France women's youth international footballers
France women's international footballers
Olympique Lyonnais Féminin players
Sportspeople from Blois
CNFE Clairefontaine players
Montpellier HSC (women) players
Expatriate women's soccer players in the United States
FIFA Century Club
2003 FIFA Women's World Cup players
2011 FIFA Women's World Cup players
Footballers at the 2012 Summer Olympics
Olympic footballers of France
Women's association football midfielders
Division 1 Féminine players
Olympique Lyonnais Féminin managers
Knights of the Ordre national du Mérite
Women's Professional Soccer players
Footballers from Centre-Val de Loire
French expatriate women's footballers